The National Association of Emergency Medical Technicians is an American professional association representing Emergency medical technicians and paramedics.

Lobbying 

In March 2013, the association unsuccessfully lobbied for the Veteran Emergency Medical Technician Support Act of 2013, which would have amended the Public Health Service Act.

References

External links
 

Allied health professions-related professional associations
501(c)(6) nonprofit organizations